Election to the 7th Russian State Duma were held on 18 September 2016. 450 members were elected, 225 of them by party lists and 225 in Single-member constituencies.

List

See also
List of members of the 7th Russian State Duma who were not re-elected

References

7th State Duma of the Russian Federation
7th